"Close the Door" is a hit song written by Kenny Gamble and Leon Huff. It was a hit for Teddy Pendergrass in 1978, and was released from his second solo album, Life Is a Song Worth Singing.

Chart performance
The song spent two weeks at number one on the R&B chart and peaked at number twenty-five on the U.S. Billboard Hot 100.  It became a gold record.
In the UK, "Close the Door" was a double-sided release along with Only You, it peaked at #41.

Samples
In 2002, R&B/hip hop soul girl group 3LW sampled Close the Door for their song "Neva Get Enuf" 
Mary J. Blige sampled the track in her song, "All Night Long" taken from her second album, My Life. 
Ayanda Jiya also sampled the track on her song "Go Go Girl".
Rapper Keith Murray sampled the track in his song, "Get Lifted" from his 1994 debut album, The Most Beautifullest Thing in This World.

Altogether, the song has been sampled 45 times in popular music, primarily in the hip hop genre.

References

See also 
List of number-one R&B singles of 1978 (U.S.)

1978 singles
Songs written by Leon Huff
Songs written by Kenny Gamble
Teddy Pendergrass songs
1978 songs
Philadelphia International Records singles